Twinstar may refer to:
Diamond DA42 Twin Star, a light twin-engine aircraft built by Diamond Aircraft
Eurocopter AS355 TwinStar, a twin-engine light helicopter originally manufactured by Aérospatiale
Honda Twinstar, a CM series motorcycle made during the late 1970s
Farrington Twinstar, an American autogyro design
Mosler TwinStar, an automobile developed by Mosler Automotive in 2000
Kolb Twinstar, ultralight aircraft
"Twinstar", a song by Veruca Salt from their 1994 album American Thighs
Solar twin star, in astronomy is otherwise known as a Solar analog
TwinStar Credit Union, a community credit union in Washington State and Oregon